Ioannis Selachoglou (born 28 April 1976) is a Greek darts player who plays in Professional Darts Corporation events.

Darts Career
In 2016, he made his TV debut in the 2016 PDC World Cup of Darts, where he partnered John Michael, but lost in the first round to the Canada pair of John Part and Ken MacNeil. The following year, they returned and after defeating Thailand in the first round, they lost to Belgium in round two, where Selachoglou lost to Kim Huybrechts. He is the manager of Martin Schindler

References

External links

1976 births
Living people
Greek darts players
Professional Darts Corporation associate players
PDC World Cup of Darts Greek team